Palisse is a commune in the Corrèze department in central France.

Geography
The Triouzoune flows south-southeast through the eastern part of the commune. The Vianon flows south through the middle of the commune. The Luzège forms part of the commune's western boundary.

Population

See also
Communes of the Corrèze department

References

Communes of Corrèze